Darrell Joseph Horcher (born July 28, 1987) is an American mixed martial artist who competes in the Lightweight division. A professional since 2010, he formerly competed for the UFC, Bellator and the Cage Fury Fighting Championships, where he was the Lightweight Champion.

Background
Born in Chicago and raised in Shermans Dale, Pennsylvania, Horcher began wrestling during his freshman year at West Perry High School, graduating in 2005. Later, he transitioned to mixed martial arts.

Mixed martial arts career

Early career
Horcher compiled an amateur record of 4–1 before turning professional in September 2010, Horcher fought all of his earlier fights in Pennsylvania-based promotions. With a record of 5–0, he signed with Bellator in 2012.

Bellator MMA
Horcher made his Bellator debut against then-undefeated E. J. Brooks in a Bellator season seven lightweight tournament reserve bout on October 19, 2012 at Bellator 77. Despite coming in as an underdog, Horcher won the fight via knockout in just 21 seconds into first round.

Horcher then faced Chris Liguori at Bellator 83 on December 7, 2012. Horcher won the fight via unanimous decision.

Horcher was handed his first professional loss via unanimous decision to former TUF 8 contestant Phillipe Nover at Bellator 95.

Cage Fury Fighting Championships
After his stint in Bellator, Horcher was expected to face Mike Bannon at CFFC 25 on June 22, 2013. However, the bout was cancelled for unknown reasons.

Horcher faced Mike Medrano at CFFC 30: Sterling vs. Roberts on November 2, 2013. He won the fight via unanimous decision.

Horcher faced Gabriel Miglioli at CFFC 35: Heckman vs. Makashvili on April 26, 2014. He won the fight via unanimous decision.

Horcher was expected to face Gil de Freitas at CES 25 on August 8, 2014. However, the fight was cancelled for unknown reasons.

Horcher faced Alex Ricci at CFFC 40: Horcher vs. Ricci on August 23, 2014. He won the fight via unanimous decision.

Horcher faced Jordan Stiner for the vacant CFFC lightweight championship at CFFC 45: Stiner vs. Horcher on February 7, 2015. He won the fight via TKO in the third round.

Ultimate Fighting Championship
Horcher was tabbed as a short notice replacement to face Khabib Nurmagomedov on April 16, 2016 at UFC on Fox 19. The contest took place at a catchweight of 160 lbs. He lost the fight via second-round TKO.

Horcher faced Devin Powell on June 25, 2017 at UFC Fight Night 112. He won the fight via split decision.

Horcher faced Scott Holtzman on December 9, 2017 at UFC Fight Night 123. He lost the fight by unanimous decision.

Horcher faced promotional newcomer Roosevelt Roberts on November 30, 2018 at The Ultimate Fighter 28 Finale. He lost the fight via a guillotine choke in round one.

Horcher was released by UFC in December 2019.

Post UFC
After the release, Horcher returned to CFFC and was expected to face Vadim Ogar at CFFC 88 on November 18, 2020. However, the bout was rescheduled to CFFC 90 on December 17, 2020. In turn, the bout was postponed to take place a day later on December 18, 2020 at CFFC 91. Horcher won the fight via first-minute knockout.

Horcher, as a replacement for Natan Schulte, faced Olivier Aubin-Mercier on August 13, 2021 at PFL 7. At weigh-ins, Horcher weighed in at 159.25 pounds, missing weight by 3.25 pounds. The bout proceeded at catchweight and he was fined 20% of his purse, which went to his opponent Aubin-Mercier. Horcher lost the bout via unanimous decision.

Horcher was scheduled to face Akhmed Aliev at Eagle FC 46 on March 11, 2022. The day of the event, the bout was postponed to Eagle FC 47 set for May 20. Horcher lost the fight via first-minute knockout. 

Horcher faced Akhmed Aliev on May 20, 2022 at Eagle FC 47. He lost the bout via knockout 30 seconds into the bout.

Championships and accomplishments

Mixed martial arts
Cage Fury Fighting Championships
CFFC Lightweight Championship (one time; former)
One successful title defense
Complete Devastation MMA
CDMMA lightweight championship (one time; former)

Mixed martial arts record

|-
| Loss
|align=center|14–6
|Akhmed Aliev
|KO (punches)
|Eagle FC 47
|
|align=center|1
|align=center|0:30
|Miami, Florida, United States
|
|-
|Loss
|align=center|14–5
|Olivier Aubin-Mercier
|Decision (unanimous)
|PFL 7 
|
|align=center|3
|align=center|5:00
|Hollywood, Florida, United States
|
|-
|Win
|align=center|14–4
|Vadim Ogar
|TKO (punches)
|CFFC 91
|
|align=center| 1
|align=center| 0:29
|Lancaster, Pennsylvania, United States
|
|-
|Loss
|align=center|13–4
|Roosevelt Roberts
|Submission (guillotine choke)
|The Ultimate Fighter: Heavy Hitters Finale 
|
|align=center|1
|align=center|4:50
|Las Vegas, Nevada, United States
|  
|-
|Loss
|align=center|13–3
|Scott Holtzman
|Decision (unanimous)
|UFC Fight Night: Swanson vs. Ortega 
|
|align=center|3
|align=center|5:00
|Fresno, California, United States
|
|-
|Win
|align=center|13–2
|Devin Powell
|Decision (split)
|UFC Fight Night: Chiesa vs. Lee
|
|align=center|3
|align=center|5:00
|Oklahoma City, Oklahoma, United States
|
|-
|Loss
|align=center|12–2
|Khabib Nurmagomedov
|TKO (punches)
|UFC on Fox: Teixeira vs. Evans
|
|align=center|2
|align=center|3:38
|Tampa, Florida, United States
|
|-
|Win
|align=center|12–1
|Stephen Regman
|TKO (punches)
|CFFC 52: Horcher vs. Regman
|
|align=center|3
|align=center|3:23
|Atlantic City, New Jersey, United States
|
|-
|Win
|align=center|11–1
|Jordan Stiner
|TKO (head kick and punches)
|CFFC 45: Stiner vs. Horcher
|
|align=center|3
|align=center|3:45
|Atlantic City, New Jersey, United States
|
|-
|Win
|align=center|10–1
|Alex Ricci
|Decision (unanimous)
|CFFC 40: Horcher vs. Ricci
|
|align=center|3
|align=center|5:00
|King of Prussia, Pennsylvania, United States
|
|-
|Win
|align=center|9–1
|Gabriel Miglioli
|Decision (unanimous)
|CFFC 35: Heckman vs. Makashvili
|
|align=center|3
|align=center|5:00
|Atlantic City, New Jersey, United States
|
|-
|Win
|align=center|8–1
|Mike Medrano
|Decision (unanimous)
|CFFC 30: Sterling vs. Roberts
|
|align=center|3
|align=center|5:00
|King of Prussia, Pennsylvania, United States
|
|-
|Loss
|align=center|7–1
|Phillipe Nover
|Decision (unanimous)
|Bellator 95
|
|align=center|3
|align=center|5:00
|Atlantic City, New Jersey, United States
|
|-
|Win
|align=center|7–0
|Chris Liguori
|Decision (unanimous)
|Bellator 83
|
|align=center|3
|align=center|5:00
|Atlantic City, New Jersey, United States
|
|-
|Win
|align=center|6–0
|E. J. Brooks
|KO (punch)
|Bellator 77
|
|align=center|1
|align=center|0:21
|Reading, Pennsylvania, United States
|
|-
|Win
|align=center|5–0
|George Sheppard
|KO (punches)
|CDMMA: Complete Devastation 5
|
|align=center|2
|align=center|2:36
|Altoona, Pennsylvania, United States
|
|-
|Win
|align=center|4–0
|Jon Washington
|Decision (unanimous)
|Pennsylvania Fighting Championship 6
|
|align=center|3
|align=center|5:00
|Harrisburg, Pennsylvania, United States
|
|-
|Win
|align=center|3–0
|Terrell Hobbs
|Submission (kimura)
|Pennsylvania Fighting Championship 5
|
|align=center|2
|align=center|3:34
|Harrisburg, Pennsylvania, United States
|
|-
|Win
|align=center|2–0
|William Metts
|TKO (punches)
|PFC: PA Fighting Championships 4
|
|align=center|1
|align=center|4:40
|Harrisburg, Pennsylvania, United States
|
|-
|Win
|align=center|1–0
|Steve Franklin
|TKO (punches)
|Fight Night in the Cage 1
|
|align=center|1
|align=center|0:48
|Lancaster, Pennsylvania, United States
|

References

External links
 
 

Living people
1987 births
American male mixed martial artists
Lightweight mixed martial artists
Mixed martial artists utilizing wrestling
Mixed martial artists utilizing Brazilian jiu-jitsu
Ultimate Fighting Championship male fighters
American practitioners of Brazilian jiu-jitsu